James Thorne Erskine, 14th Earl of Mar and 16th Earl of Kellie,  (born 10 March 1949) is a Scottish peer and former Liberal Democrat member of the House of Lords.

Educated at Eton, he was Page of Honour to Queen Elizabeth II in 1962 and 1963. He proceeded to Moray House College of Education, Edinburgh, before embarking on a career in social work with various Scottish local authorities. He has also worked as a boatbuilder, and has served with the Royal Auxiliary Air Force and Royal Naval Auxiliary Service.

Having succeeded to the titles the previous year, the earl took his seat in the House of Lords in 1994, choosing to sit on the Liberal Democrat benches. He lost his seat after the passage of the House of Lords Act 1999. However, on 19 April 2000, he was created a life peer as Baron Erskine of Alloa Tower, of Alloa in the County of Clackmannanshire, enabling him to return to the House. He was the Liberal Democrat candidate for the constituency of Ochil in the 1999 Scottish Parliament election, but was not elected. He retired from the House of Lords on 30 June 2017.

As the 16th Viscount Fentoun, he is Premier Viscount in the Peerage of Scotland. He is also Chief of the Name and Arms of Erskine. Since 1991, he has been a Deputy Lieutenant of Clackmannanshire.

Owing to a dispute in the nineteenth century, there is another Earldom of Mar, held by Margaret Alison of Mar, 31st Countess of Mar. Precedence as determined by the Decreet of Ranking is Countess of Mar, 4th (created 1404) and Earl of Mar and Kellie, 10th (created 1619).

As the Earl of Mar does not have any children, his heir presumptive is his younger brother Hon. Alexander David Erskine.

References

External links

Earl of Mar and Kellie, House of Lords
Announcement of his taking the oath under his new title at the House of Lords House of Lords minutes of proceedings, 19 April 2000
The Edinburgh Gazette announcing the title of Baron Erskine of Alloa Tower, of Alloa in Clackmannanshire

1949 births
Living people
People educated at Eton College
Kellie, James Erskine, earl of Mar and
Earls of Kellie
Liberal Democrats (UK) hereditary peers
Liberal Democrats (UK) life peers
James
Scottish clan chiefs
Deputy Lieutenants of Clackmannanshire
Erskine
Life peers created by Elizabeth II
Mar and Kellie